Pseudodaphnella granicostata is a species of sea snail, a marine gastropod mollusk in the family Raphitomidae.

Description
The length of the shell varies between 8 mm and 13 mm.

The shell is yellowish or blush-brown, with a white band above the middle, the nodules darker-colored.

Distribution
This marine species occurs in the Pacific Ocean; also off Mauritius, Madagascar, the Cocos Keeling Islands, the Cook Islands, the Fiji Islands, Samoa, the Philippines, Taiwan and Queensland, Australia.

References

 Adams, H. & Adams, A. 1853. The genera of Recent Mollusca arranged according to their organization. London : John Van Voorst Vol. 1(Parts I-VIII) pp. 1–256, pls 1–32.
Notes on a collection of shells from Lifu and Uvea, Loyalty Islands, from by the Rev. James and Mrs. Hadfield, with list of species. Journal of Conchology 8: 89–132
 Boettger, O. 1895. Die marinen Mollusken der Philippinen. IV. Die Pleurotomiden. Nachrichtsblatt der Deutschen Malakozooligischen Gesellschaft 27(1–2, 3–4): 1–20, 41–63 
 Maes, V.O. 1967. The littoral marine mollusks of Cocos-Keeling Islands (Indian Ocean). Proceedings of the Academy of Natural Sciences, Philadelphia 119: 93–217 
 Cernohorsky, W.O. 1972. Marine Shells of the Pacific. Sydney : Pacific Publications Vol. 2 411 pp., 68 pls. 
 Drivas, J.; Jay, M. (1987). Coquillages de La Réunion et de l'Île Maurice. Collection Les Beautés de la Nature. Delachaux et Niestlé: Neuchâtel. . 159 pp
 Liu, J.Y. [Ruiyu] (ed.). (2008). Checklist of marine biota of China seas. China Science Press. 1267 pp.

External links
 
 L.A. Reeve (1843) - Conchologia iconica, or, Illustrations of the shells of molluscous animals vol. 1  Reeve, L.A. 1846. Monograph of the genus Pleurotoma. pls 34–40 in Reeve, L.A. (ed). Conchologia Iconica. London : L. Reeve & Co. Vol. 1]
 Martens E. von. (1880). Mollusken. Pp. 179–353, pl. 19–22 In K. Moebius, F. Richters & E. von Martens, Beiträge zur Meeresfauna der Insel Mauritius und der Seychellen. Berlin: Gutmann
  Melvill J.C. & Standen R. (1896) Notes on a collection of shells from Lifu and Uvea, Loyalty Islands, formed by the Rev. James and Mrs. Hadfield, with list of species. Part II. Journal of Conchology 8: 273–315  Melvill, J.C. & Standen, R. 1895]
 Li B.-Q. [Baoquan] & Li X.-Z. [Xinzheng] (2014) Report on the Raphitomidae Bellardi, 1875 (Mollusca: Gastropoda: Conoidea) from the China Seas. Journal of Natural History 48(17–18): 999–1025

granicostata
Gastropods described in 1846